The Jameh Mosque of Damavand is an historical congregational mosque in the city of Damavand, Iran.

Built in Seljuq dynasty era, the mosque includes traces of Sassanid architecture. An inscription with the name Ismail I Safavi can also be seen there.

Sources 

Mosque buildings with domes
Buildings and structures in Tehran Province
Tourist attractions in Tehran Province
Mosques in Iran
Damavand